Starksia cremnobates, the fugitive blenny, is a species of labrisomid blenny endemic to the Gulf of California where it is found at depths of around .

References

cremnobates
Fish described in 1890